Jason Warren Pope (born 20 September 1995) is an English professional footballer who plays for Weston-super-Mare as a defender and midfielder.

Club career
Pope joined Exeter City's youth setup in 2003, aged eight. He then progressed through the Academy team, and was awarded a professional deal on 14 April 2014.

Pope made his first-team debut on 7 October, replacing Scot Bennett in a 1–3 Football League Trophy away loss against Coventry City.

On 17 July 2015, Pope, along with Alex Byrne, joined Weston-super-Mare on a six-month youth loan.

Pope was released by Exeter City on 13 May 2016 He later rejoined Weston-super-Mare for the 2016–17 season.

On 26 June 2019 he joined National League North club Hereford.

Career statistics

References

External links
Exeter City profile

1995 births
Living people
Sportspeople from Exeter
Footballers from Devon
English footballers
Association football midfielders
Exeter City F.C. players
Weston-super-Mare A.F.C. players
Hereford F.C. players